The Millers River is a river in the eastern section of the U.S. state of Rhode Island. It flows approximately 3 km (2 mi). There are no dams along the river's length.

Course
The river rises from an unnamed pond, now known as Friars' Cirque, Ea. along Bear Hill Road in Cumberland and flows due south to its confluence with Abbott Run at Robin Hollow Pond.

Crossings
Below is a list of all crossings over the Millers River. The list starts at the headwaters and goes downstream.
Cumberland
Bear Hill Road
Oakledge Road
Curran Road

Tributaries
The Millers River has no named tributaries, though it has many unnamed streams that also feed it.

See also
List of rivers in Rhode Island

References
Maps from the United States Geological Survey

Rivers of Providence County, Rhode Island
Cumberland, Rhode Island
Rivers of Rhode Island
Tributaries of Providence River